Whitehaven, informally known as "Blackhaven", is a predominantly African-American community in Memphis, Tennessee, United States. It was first organized in the late 19th century as a neighborhood for upper-class families. Its current population is about 50,000.

History
The community takes its name from a Colonel Francis White, who was an early settler and major property owner. White was influential in getting a rail line to run through what was first called White's Station, later Whitehaven. This Mississippi and Tennessee Railroad was chartered in 1853, and the first trains ran in 1856. The first "White Haven" post office was opened in 1871. The roads and train tracks connected the cotton farms of the Mississippi Delta to Memphis markets, establishing strong commercial links.

Some of the other founding family names are Raines, Hale, McCorkle, and Harbin. E. W. Hale moved to the area in the 1880s and opened a store near what is now Whitehaven High School on Elvis Presley Blvd. Hale's Store was a landmark for many decades.

In 1926, WREC radio began operations there, and in 1928 Whitehaven Hoyt B. Wooten was one of the first six television licensees in America. His original home is the centerpiece of a private development called Lion's Gate.

Much of the later residential and commercial development was done by Carrington Jones and Lacy Mosby in the mid 20th century, to provide housing for "baby boom" families who moved from Memphis to a pleasant environment in the old community. This gradually transformed plantation tracts to neighborhoods in the late 1940s and 1950s.

Formerly a farm community, Whitehaven was developed as a residential suburban area of Memphis in the 1950s and early 1960s. In 1950, Whitehaven had a population of 1,311.  In 1960, Whitehaven had a population of 13,894.

On January 1, 1970, Whitehaven was forcefully annexed by the City of Memphis. Prior to this annexation, the residents of the area did not want to be a part of Memphis. Several years later after Whitehaven became the city's territory, the majority of the white families of the area left and moved to the outer-Memphis suburbs. This led to Whitehaven becoming a majority predominantly African American community. It was integrated in the late 1960s and white flight ensued over the next two decades. Whitehaven is now a part of South Memphis.

Geography

Whitehaven is a neighborhood in South Memphis and is roughly bounded by Brooks Road on the north and the Mississippi state line on the south, with the Illinois Central Railroad on the west and Airways Boulevard on the east.

The major traffic artery of the community is U.S. Route 51, later known as Elvis Presley Boulevard. This roadway began as a toll "Plank Road" built between Memphis and Hernando, Mississippi in 1852.

Arts and culture

Whitehaven's major tourist attractions are still Graceland mansion and the annual Elvis Week, attracting many thousands there annually to remember "The King" on the anniversary of his death on August 16, 1977. Elvis Presley bought his famous home in 1957; soon afterward the farmland surrounding the estate was subdivided into homesites.  During the two decades he lived in Whitehaven, Elvis spent as much time as possible at his home and was a beloved neighbor to residents there.

Southland Mall
Southland Mall opened at the corner of Shelby Drive and Highway 51 South in 1966 (officially becoming Elvis Presley Blvd on January 19, 1972), and is still a destination for shoppers from all over the region. It greatly helped the community to prosper. Southland Mall was the first enclosed mall in Memphis.

Parks and recreation
David Carnes Park is named for the early African-American landowner and blacksmith David Carnes, whose property is now the site of the park. David Carnes Park underwent a $5.4 million renovation in August 2019. The park includes a splash pad, playground, walking paths, fitness equipment, obstacle course, turfed multipurpose field, and multiple pavilions.

Education
Five high schools are in the Whitehaven area: Fairley High School, Hillcrest High School, Pathways In Education, Whitehaven High School and Freedom Preparatory Academy High School. Whitehaven High School was opened by 1911 with evidence of the  school dating back to 1893 and was the only high school in the community until Hillcrest opened during the 1960s.  A strong rivalry developed between the two schools, and the Hillcrest/Whitehaven game became one of the major events in the community during football season.  Bishop Byrne, a private co-educational Catholic high school adjacent to Saint Paul Church on Shelby Drive, opened in 1966 and closed in 2013.

Public schools
 Whitehaven High School
 Hillcrest High School (Green Dot Charter system affiliate)
 Havenview Middle School
 A. Maceo Walker Middle School
 Whitehaven Elementary School
 Gardenview Elementary School
 Robert R Church Elementary School
 Oakshire Elementary School
 Holmes Road Elementary School
 Pathways In Education (7-12)
 Fairley High School (Green Dot Charter system affiliate)
 John P. Freeman Optional School (K-8)
 Freedom Preparatory Academy Elementary School
 Freedom Preparatory Academy Middle School
 Freedom Preparatory Academy High School

Private Schools in 38116 (Whitehaven)
 Bishop Byrne Middle and High School (closed)
 St. Paul Catholic School (PK-8th grades)
 City University Preparatory Schools and Liberal Arts
 Du Bois School of Arts & Technology (closed)
 Memphis Preparatory School (closed)

Notable people
 DJ Paul-a member of Three 6 Mafia
 Tommy Wright III
 Gangsta Boo
 Drumma Boy
 Gangsta Pat
 Dontari Poe
 Elvis Presley
 Duke Deuce

References

Neighborhoods in Memphis, Tennessee
Populated places established in 1871
Populated places disestablished in 1970
1871 establishments in Tennessee
Former municipalities in Tennessee
African-American history in Memphis, Tennessee